Sébastien Ducourneau (born October 8, 1975 in Mont-de-Marsan) is a French professional football player. Currently, he plays in the Championnat de France amateur for Vendée Fontenay Foot.

He played on the professional level in Ligue 2 for Angers SCO.

1975 births
Living people
French footballers
Ligue 2 players
Angers SCO players
Vendée Fontenay Foot players
Association football forwards